Jana Šaldová (born July 8, 1975) is a Czech cross-country skier who competed from 1994 to 2003. Competing at the 1998 Winter Olympics in Nagano, she finished sixth in the 4 × 5 km relay, 28th in the 5 km event, and 29th in the 15 km event.

Šaldová's best finish at the FIS Nordic World Ski Championships was 27th in the 5 km event at Trondheim in 1997. Her best World Cup finish was 33rd in a 5 km event in the Czech Republic in 2002.

Šaldová earned two individual career victories up to 15 km in the Czech Republic, both in 1998.

Cross-country skiing results
All results are sourced from the International Ski Federation (FIS).

Olympic Games

World Championships

a.  Cancelled due to extremely cold weather.

World Cup

Season standings

References

External links

Women's 4 × 5 km cross-country relay Olympic results: 1976–2002 

1975 births
Cross-country skiers at the 1998 Winter Olympics
Czech female cross-country skiers
Living people
Olympic cross-country skiers of the Czech Republic
People from Jilemnice
Sportspeople from the Liberec Region